Always a Body To Trade is a crime novel by the American writer K. C. Constantine set in 1980s Rocksburg, a fictional, blue-collar, Rust Belt town in Western Pennsylvania, modeled on the author's hometown of McKees Rocks, Pennsylvania, adjacent to Pittsburgh.

Mario Balzic is the protagonist, an atypical detective for the genre, a Serbo-Italian American cop, middle-aged, unpretentious, a family man who asks questions and uses more sense than force.

The novel tells the story of a double robbery in two identical apartments, rented but hardly ever used by a Pittsburgh drug dealer who's clean with the law. A young woman is found shot dead on the street, she cannot be identified but her murder has all the appearances of a professional hit. The new mayor of Rocksburg is near hysteria, and he smears the case all over Balzic, who not only has to solve the murder but teach his nosy new boss the not-so-plain facts of police work.

It is the sixth book in the 17-volume Rocksburg series.

Reference list 
Novel Page on Publisher's Website

References

1983 American novels
Novels by K. C. Constantine
American crime novels
Novels set in Pennsylvania
Godine books